Critical international relations theory is a diverse set of schools of thought in international relations (IR) that have criticized the theoretical, meta-theoretical and/or political status quo, both in IR theory and in international politics more broadly – from positivist as well as postpositivist positions.  Positivist critiques include Marxist and neo-Marxist approaches and certain ("conventional") strands of social constructivism.  Postpositivist critiques include poststructuralist, postcolonial, "critical" constructivist, critical theory (in the strict sense used by the Frankfurt School), neo-Gramscian, most feminist, and some English School approaches, as well as non-Weberian historical sociology, "international political sociology", "critical geopolitics", and the so-called "new materialism" (partly inspired by actor–network theory).  All of these latter approaches differ from both realism and liberalism in their epistemological and ontological premises.

See also

Feminism (international relations)
Postcolonialism (international relations)
Postmodernism (international relations)

References

Footnotes

Bibliography

Further reading

 
 
 
 
 
 
 
 
 
 
 
 
 
 
 
 
 

Critical theory
Feminist theory
International relations theory
Marxist theory
Political science theories